Solson Publications was a New York-based black-and-white comic book publisher active in the 1980s. The company was founded by Gary Brodsky, son of long-time Marvel Comics executive Sol Brodsky; the name of the company was derived from Brodsky's name: "Sol's son" = Solson.

Titles published
 Amazing Wahzoo
 Blackmoon
 The Bushido Blade of Zatoichi Walrus
 Christmas Comic
 Codename: Ninja
 Escape To The Stars
 Iron Maidens
 Ninjutsu
 Reagan's Raiders — by Monroe Arnold and Rich Buckler
 Rich Buckler's Secrets of Drawing Comics
 Rock Heads
 Samurai Funnies Featuring...
 Santeria: The Religion
 Scream
 Solson Christmas Special: Samurai Santa (1986) — featured Jim Lee's professional debut as an inker
 Solson's Comic Talent Starsearch
 Sultry Teenage Super-Foxes
 Teenage Mutant Ninja Turtles Martial Arts Training Manual
 Teenage Mutant Ninja Turtles Teach Karate
 Those Crazy Peckers
 The Three Stooges
 T.H.U.N.D.E.R.

How To series 
 How to Become A Comic Book Artist
 How to Draw Adult Anime
 How to Draw Aliens
 How to Draw Anime For Dummies
 How to Draw Comics Comic
 How to Draw Erotic Art
 How to Draw Erotic Witches And Vampy Vampires
 How to Draw Fantasy Art
 How to Draw Fetish Art: Ultimate In Sensuality
 How to Draw Halloween Girls
 How to Draw Heads Every Which Way
 How to Draw Heavenly Bodies
 How to Draw Sexy Career Women
 How to Draw Sexy Witches, Wenches and Vampires
 How to Draw Sexy Women
 How to Draw Spaceships And Futuristic Stuff
 How to Draw Super-Heroes
 How to Draw Teenage Mutant Ninja Turtles
 How to Publish Comics

References 

American companies established in 1986
Comic book publishing companies of the United States
Companies based in New York City
Defunct comics and manga publishing companies
United States-themed superheroes
Publishing companies established in 1986